Alan Notley (born 10 April 1940) is a British biathlete. He competed at the 1964 Winter Olympics, the 1968 Winter Olympics and the 1972 Winter Olympics.

References

1940 births
Living people
British male biathletes
Olympic biathletes of Great Britain
Biathletes at the 1964 Winter Olympics
Biathletes at the 1968 Winter Olympics
Biathletes at the 1972 Winter Olympics
Sportspeople from Poole